The women's solo was one of two events in the synchronized swimming program at the 1984 Summer Olympics. The final was held on August 12, 1984.

To qualify for the final, the swimmers had to compete in a figures competition. One swimmer from each country was allowed to perform their prepared solo routines. A total of seventeen swimmers qualified to compete in the solo competition.

Results

Technical figures

Qualification

Final

References

External links
Official Olympic Report

1984
1984 in synchronized swimming
1984 in women's sport
Women's events at the 1984 Summer Olympics